Teaspoon may refer to:
Teaspoon, a small spoon, and a measure of volume
T-Spoon, a Dutch pop/dance band created in 1991 
"Teaspoon", a song by The Long Winters from the 2006 album Putting the Days to Bed
Aloysius "Teaspoon" Hunter, a character in the American television series The Young Riders
"Teaspoon", an award winning Hindi short film released in 2015

See also
Iced tea spoon, a long, thin spoon used primarily in the United States